The Jazz KENnection is an album by clarinetist Kenny Davern and saxophonist Ken Peplowski with guitarist Howard Alden.

Track listing 
 I'm Satisfied With My Gal (Sharkey Bonano)
 Mama's Gone, Goodbye (Peter Bocage)
 I'll See You in My Dreams  (Isham Jones, Gus Kahn)
 Georgia on My Mind (Hoagy Carmichael, Stuart Gorrell)
 Careless Love (W.C. Handy, Martha E. Koenig, Spencer Williams)
 Creole Love Call (Duke Ellington)
 Chicago Rhythm (Transvestite Dance from the Apex Club) (Ben Kanter)
 All of Me  (Gerald Marks, Seymour Simons)
 A Porter's Love Song to a Chambermaid (James P. Johnson, Andy Razaf)

Personnel
 Kenny Davern – clarinet
 Ken Peplowski – alto saxophone, clarinet
 Howard Alden – guitar
 John Bunch – piano
 Tony DeNicola – drums
 Greg Cohen – double-bass

References

2001 albums
Kenny Davern albums
Ken Peplowski albums
Dixieland revival albums
Dixieland albums
Swing albums
Arbors Records albums